J.G. Bachmann (1891–1952) was a Russian-born American film producer. Amongst the studios he was involved with were Preferred Pictures, Paramount and RKO. His son Lawrence Bachmann also became a film producer.

Selected filmography
 The Romance of a Million Dollars (1926)
 His New York Wife (1926)
 Lew Tyler's Wives (1926)
 Dancing Days (1926)
 Shameful Behavior? (1926)
 The Docks of New York (1928)
 Interference (1928)
 The Last Command (1928)
 Nothing but the Truth (1929)
 Redskin (1929)
 The Love Doctor (1929)
 The Secret Witness (1931)
 Strange Justice (1932)
 Goldie Gets Along (1933)
 Man Hunt (1933)
 Eight Bells (1935)
 Double Cross (1941)

References

External links

Bibliography
 Kellow, Brian. The Bennetts: An Acting Family. University Press of Kentucky, 2004.
 Pitts, Michael R. Thrills Untapped: Neglected Horror, Science Fiction and Fantasy Films, 1928-1936. McFarland, 2018.
 Turk, Edward Baron. Hollywood Diva: A Biography of Jeanette MacDonald. University of California Press, 1998.

1891 births
1952 deaths
American film producers
Russian film producers
Emigrants from the Russian Empire to the United States